Exercise prescription software is a branch of computer software designed to aid in the construction of exercise programmes or regimes for patients who require some kind of ongoing rehabilitation.

Exercise prescription is common in physiotherapy practices where traditionally patients would be given a printed handout with diagrams and instructions describing any rehabilitation exercises. As high speed internet becomes prevalent in the home, and paperless offices are more desirable, prescribed exercises may be e-mailed to patients. diagrams may be replaced by instructional videos,  and new technologies (apps for mobile devices, wearable devices, and online support forums) have expanded the ways in which exercise may be prescribed and monitored.

References

See also
Exercise is Medicine
Exercise prescription
List of exercise prescription software

Physical exercise
Medical software